In geometry, a trirectangular tetrahedron is a tetrahedron where all three face angles at one vertex are right angles. That vertex is called the right angle of the trirectangular tetrahedron and the face opposite it is called the base. The three edges that meet at the right angle are called the legs and the perpendicular from the right angle to the base is called the altitude of the tetrahedron.

Only the bifurcating graph of the  Affine Coxeter group has a Trirectangular tetrahedron fundamental domain.

Metric formulas
If the legs have lengths a, b, c, then the trirectangular tetrahedron has the volume

The altitude h satisfies

The area  of the base is given by

De Gua's theorem

This is a generalization of the Pythagorean theorem to a tetrahedron.

Integer solution

Perfect body

The area of the base (a,b,c) is always (Gua) an irrational number. Thus a trirectangular tetrahedron with integer edges is never a perfect body. The trirectangular bipyramid (6 faces, 9 edges, 5 vertices) built from these trirectangular tetrahedrons and the related left-handed ones connected on their bases have rational edges, faces and volume, but the inner space-diagonal between the two trirectangular vertices is still irrational. The later one is the double of the altitude of the trirectangular tetrahedron and a rational part of the (proved) irrational space-diagonal of the related Euler-brick (bc, ca, ab).

Integer edges
Trirectangular tetrahedrons with integer legs  and sides  of the base triangle exist, e.g.  (discovered 1719 by Halcke). Here are a few more examples with integer legs and sides.
     a        b        c        d        e        f 

    240      117       44      125      244      267
    275      252      240      348      365      373
    480      234       88      250      488      534
    550      504      480      696      730      746
    693      480      140      500      707      843
    720      351      132      375      732      801
    720      132       85      157      725      732
    792      231      160      281      808      825
    825      756      720     1044     1095     1119
    960      468      176      500      976     1068
   1100     1008      960     1392     1460     1492
   1155     1100     1008     1492     1533     1595
   1200      585      220      625     1220     1335
   1375     1260     1200     1740     1825     1865
   1386      960      280     1000     1414     1686
   1440      702      264      750     1464     1602
   1440      264      170      314     1450     1464
Notice that some of these are multiples of smaller ones. Note also .

Integer faces

See also
Irregular tetrahedra
Standard simplex
Euler Brick

References

External links 

Polyhedra